Following is a list of dams and reservoirs in California in a sortable table. There are over 1,400 named dams and 1,300 named reservoirs in the state of California.

Dams in service

Please add to this list from the below sources.

Former dams
Baldwin Hills Reservoir (1947–1963) failed December 14, 1963
St. Francis Dam (1926–1928) failed March 12, 1928
San Clemente Dam, intentionally removed in 2015 - 2016 because of environmental issues.
Van Norman Dams (1911–1971) failed February 9, 1971, in 1971 San Fernando earthquake

Proposed dams
 Ah Pah Dam (defunct)
 Auburn Dam (defunct)
 Centennial Dam
 Sites Reservoir
 Temperance Flat Dam

See also
California State Water Project
List of lakes in California
List of largest reservoirs of California
List of power stations in California
List of the tallest dams in the United States
List of United States Bureau of Reclamation dams
Water in California

Notes and references

Notes

References

External links 

 California Department of Water Resources, Division of Safety of Dams
 Reservoir Information: California Department of Water Resources, Division of Flood Management
 California Reservoirs Alphabetical Index

Dams and reservoirs
California, Dams and reservoirs
Dams and reservoirs
.Reservoirs and dams